James R. Panno (c. 1922 – June 9, 1970) was an American politician who served as a member of the Ohio House of Representatives for the 82nd district from 1965 to 1970.

References

1920s births
Democratic Party members of the Ohio House of Representatives
1970 deaths
20th-century American politicians